Rolandas Urbonas is a paralympic athlete from Lithuania competing mainly in category F12 shot and discus events.

Rolandas has competed at four Paralympics and has won three medals.  His first games he only competed in the F12 shot put winning the bronze medal.  During the next three Paralympics he competed in the shot and discus winning a silver in the discus in 2000 and a bronze medal in the discus in 2004 but could not win any medals in 2008.

References

Paralympic athletes of Lithuania
Athletes (track and field) at the 1996 Summer Paralympics
Athletes (track and field) at the 2000 Summer Paralympics
Athletes (track and field) at the 2004 Summer Paralympics
Athletes (track and field) at the 2008 Summer Paralympics
Paralympic silver medalists for Lithuania
Paralympic bronze medalists for Lithuania
Living people
Medalists at the 1996 Summer Paralympics
Medalists at the 2000 Summer Paralympics
Medalists at the 2004 Summer Paralympics
Year of birth missing (living people)
Paralympic medalists in athletics (track and field)
Lithuanian male discus throwers
Lithuanian male shot putters
Visually impaired discus throwers
Visually impaired shot putters
Paralympic discus throwers
Paralympic shot putters